Nitroxazepine (brand name Sintamil) is a tricyclic antidepressant (TCA) which was introduced by Ciba-Geigy (now Novartis) for the treatment of depression in India in 1982. It is also indicated for the treatment of nocturnal enuresis. Nitroxazepine acts as a serotonin-norepinephrine reuptake inhibitor and has similar effects to imipramine, but with certain advantages, such as lower anticholinergic side effects.

References

Dibenzoxazepines
Lactams
Muscarinic antagonists
Nitro compounds